Island City may refer to:

In geography
Island City, Indiana, an unincorporated settlement in the United States
Island City, Kentucky
Island City, Missouri
Island City, Oregon, a city in the United States
Island City, Fukuoka (アイランドシティ), a man-made island in Japan
Island city, another name for South Mumbai; originally Mumbai was a city of seven islands.

In entertainment
Island City (1994 film), a television movie originally run on the Prime Time Entertainment Network
Island City (2015 film)

Others
Island City (schooner), American sunken schooner listed in National Register of Historic Places